The fourteenth season of Food Paradise, an American food reality television series narrated by Jess Blaze Snider on the Travel Channel, premiered on September 3, 2017. First-run episodes of the series aired in the United States on the Travel Channel on Mondays at 10:00 p.m. EDT. The season contained 13 episodes and concluded airing on January 14, 2018.

Food Paradise features the best places to find various cuisines at food locations across America. Each episode focuses on a certain type of restaurant, such as "Diners", "Bars", "Drive-Thrus" or "Breakfast" places that people go to find a certain food specialty.

Episodes 
Note: This season started on September 3, 2017 and ended on January 14, 2018.

California Dreamin'

Aloha, Hawaii

Bun-Believable

No Taste Like Home

Food Paradise XL

Apps Download

Boardwalk Bites

Minor League Baseball

Best In Chow

Dockside Dining

Fire It Up

Tasty Traditions

Date Night

References

External links
Food Paradise @Travelchannel.com

2017 American television seasons
2018 American television seasons